Titty Hill is a hamlet in the civil parish of Milland in the Chichester district of West Sussex, England. It is close to a Roman way station or mansio on the Chichester to Silchester Way.

Because titty is a slang term for breast or nipple, Titty Hill has been frequently noted for its unusual place name.

See also
List of United Kingdom locations: Ti
Cocking, West Sussex

References

External links

Villages in West Sussex